Schistochila undulatifolia is a species of liverwort in the family Schistochilaceae. It is endemic to Papua New Guinea.  Its natural habitat is subtropical or tropical dry forests. It is threatened by habitat loss.

References

Jungermanniales
Flora of Papua New Guinea
Critically endangered plants
Taxonomy articles created by Polbot